Antanasijević is a Serbian surname, derived from the male given name Antanas, a variant of the name Anthony. It may refer to:

Dragan Antanasijević (born 1987), Serbian football player
Nenad Antanasijević (born 1960), Serbian multimedial artist

See also

Atanasijević
Anastasijević

Serbian surnames